Carlos Pinto may refer to:

 Carlos Pinto (journalist), Chilean journalist and television presenter
 Carlos Pinto (equestrian), Portuguese Olympic dressage rider
 Carlos Pinto (footballer), Portuguese professional football coach and former player
 Carlos Mota Pinto, Portuguese professor and politician
 Carlos Maia Pinto, Prime Minister of Portugal, 1921
 Carlos Heriberto Pinto, Mexican footballer